GJHS may refer to:
 George W. Jenkins High School, Lakeland, Florida, United States
 Gorsebrook Junior High School, Halifax, Nova Scotia, Canada
 Gosforth Junior High Academy, Gosforth, Newcastle and Tyne, United States
 Grand Junction High School, Grand Junction, Colorado, United States
 Greater Johnstown High School, Johnstown, Pennsylvania, United States